The Houen Foundation Award is  Norway's most important award for architecture. It was established in 1893 by Anton Christian Houen (1823–1894). A successful  merchant and businessman, Houen  established several  philanthropic legacies and funds in culture and research.

The Houen Foundation Award is awarded to buildings that are examples of "outstanding, independently completed works of architecture" in recognition of an architect's highest achievement. The award is made by the Norwegian Ministry of Culture at a recommendation from the board of the Association of Norwegian Architects (Norske arkitekters landsforbund) in collaboration with the National Museum of Art, Architecture and Design.

See also
A. C. Houen Grant

References

External links
Norske arkitekters landsforbund website

Norwegian awards
Architecture awards